Kevin Coleman (born June 11, 1983) is an American politician from Michigan. Coleman is a Democratic member of Michigan House of Representatives from District 16.

Education 
Coleman earned a bachelor's degree from Western Michigan University.

Career 
In 2014, Coleman's political career began when he became a councilman for Westland, Michigan. On November 6, 2018, Coleman won the election and became a Democratic member of Michigan House of Representatives for District 16.

Personal life 
Coleman lives in Westland, Michigan.

See also 
 2018 Michigan House of Representatives election

References

External links 
 Kevin Coleman at ballotpedia.org
 Kevin Coleman at Housedems.com

21st-century American politicians
Michigan city council members
People from Westland, Michigan
Western Michigan University alumni
Living people
Democratic Party members of the Michigan House of Representatives
1983 births